Bill Jackson (born 1953) is a contemporary English photographer.

Education and career
Jackson graduated from Coventry School of Art and Birmingham School of Art. He first exhibited at The Photographers' Gallery in the exhibition Fleeting Gestures. His work was seen at the History of Dance Photography collection selected by Bill Jay of the ICP Gallery in New York. In 1986 he began working with early computer graphic systems and by 1991 this experimental work using film and digital combinations was shown at a conference on the future of photography at the National Museum  of Photography, Film and Television (now the National Media Museum) in Bradford.  Jackson was one of the first UK film based photographers to go over to digital imaging in 1985. He lives and works in London. His work is in many private and art trust collections.

Comments
"Every now and then, with a bit of luck, an artist will produce exceptional work that immediately demands attention. This is the case with Bill Jackson’s Morphenia, a suite of sixteen computer generated digital prints."
"His imagery was as spiky, robust and eclectic as an Hieronymus Bosch and his use of colour and ornamentation as rich and luscious as any Dutch old master."

Solo exhibitions
 1984 - Circus, Print Room, The Photographers' Gallery, London
 1984 - Love Labours Lost, Barbican Centre, London.  Portraits RSC Company
 1985 - Bill Jackson  Portraits, Impressions Gallery, York
 1985 - Bill Jackson  Portraits, Bill Brandt Room, The Photographers' Gallery, London
 1986 - New Works, Herbert Art Gallery and Museum, Coventry
 2006 - Morphenia, The White Room Gallery, Leamington Spa
 2006 - Morphenia and other works, Gallery12, London
 2007 - Inside Out, Market Place Theatre Gallery, Armagh, Northern Ireland
 2008 - Night Of The Hunter, Gallery12, London

Publications

 Portfolio Showcase, Vol. 2, published by the Center for Fine Art Photography, Fort Collins, Colorado
 Out Of My Head, published by Blurb
 Still Life Revisited, Royal Photographic Society Contemporary Photography Group (self-published)
 "Artists Profile", SLR Camera
 "Artists Profile", Creative Review
 "Exhibition Profile", City Limits
 Open 82, published by Midland Groups Galleries
 Image and Exploration, published by the Photographers Gallery, London
 The Animal in Photography 1840 - 1986, published by the Photographers Gallery, London
 Obraz i Poszukiwanie, published by Galaria Zwsazuku Polskich
 Britska Soucasna, published by Ministerstvo Kultury, CSR

Notes

External links

English contemporary artists
Photographers from Warwickshire
1953 births
Living people
Alumni of the Birmingham School of Art